Fremont is a city and county seat of Dodge County in the eastern portion of the state of Nebraska in the Midwestern United States.  The population was 27,141 at the 2020 census.  Fremont is the home of Midland University.

History

From the 1830s to the 1860s, the area saw a great deal of traffic due to the Mormon Trail, which passed along the north bank of the Platte River. A ferry connected the two banks of the Elkhorn River near Fremont. It was a major overland route for emigrant settlers going to the West, the military and hunters.

Fremont was laid out in 1856 in anticipation that the railroad would be extended to that site. It was named after the American explorer, politician and military official General John C. Frémont.  By 1857, there were 13 log houses in the town. The Union Pacific Railroad reached the town in December 1865 becoming the first railroad into the future rail hub. Sioux City and Pacific Railroad completed track into the town in 1868 with the Elkhorn Valley Railroad arriving in 1869.

Due to the town's geographically central location, the First Transcontinental Telegraph line (1861), railroad (1865) and highway (1913) passed through or very near Fremont. Original brick portions of the "Old Lincoln Highway" are located east of Fremont, on the way to Omaha.

Fremont is the namesake for the Fremont neighborhood in Seattle, which was settled by Luther H. Griffith and Edward Blewett from Fremont.

On January 10, 1976, in downtown Fremont, the Pathfinder Hotel exploded due to a natural gas leak in the basement. At the time the hotel was being used as apartments, mostly occupied by senior citizens. It also was a meeting place for philanthropic and business organizations, and had a drug store on the northwest corner. The explosion shattered windows around the city, and the ensuing fire killed 23 people and destroyed most of the city block of the hotel.

Fremont gained national attention in 2010 when residents approved a referendum that would ban illegal immigrants from renting and working in the town.

Geography

Fremont lies in the river plain between the Platte and Elkhorn rivers, at an elevation of approximately 366 meters (1,203 ft) above sea level.

Climate

Demographics

Fremont is the county seat of Dodge County, Nebraska, and is likewise the financial and social center of the area. Facilitated by the completion of the US Highway 275 and Highway 30 bypass around Fremont, from Omaha, eastern Fremont is growing rapidly as a bedroom community for Omaha (see links to air photos below).

2010 census
As of the census of 2010, there were 26,397 people, 10,725 households, and 6,862 families living in the city. The racial makeup of the city was 89.2% White, 0.7% African American, 0.6% Native American, 0.6% Asian, 0.3% Pacific Islander, 7.1% from other races, and 1.6% from two or more races. Hispanic or Latino of any race were 11.9% of the population.

There were 10,725 households, of which 31.6% had children under the age of 18 living with them, 47.8% were married couples living together, 11.2% had a female householder with no husband present, 4.9% had a male householder with no wife present, and 36.0% were non-families. 30.2% of all households were made up of individuals, and 13.4% had someone living alone who was 65 years of age or older. The average household size was 2.38 and the average family size was 2.94.

The median age in the city was 38 years. 24.2% of residents were under the age of 18; 9.9% were between the ages of 18 and 24; 23.9% were from 25 to 44; 24.7% were from 45 to 64; and 17.3% were 65 years of age or older. The gender makeup of the city was 48.5% male and 51.5% female.

2000 census
As of the census of 2000, there were 25,174 people, 10,171 households, and 6,672 families living in the city, which makes it the 6th largest city in Nebraska. The population density was 3,393.3 people per square mile (1,309.9/km). There were 10,576 housing units at an average density of 1,425.6 per square mile (550.3/km). The racial makeup of the city was 95.28% White, 0.57% African American, 0.31% Native American, 0.61% Asian, 0.11% Pacific Islander, 2.29% from other races, and 0.82% from two or more races. Hispanic or Latino of any race were 4.31% of the population.

There were 10,171 households, out of which 30.7% had children under the age of 18 living with them, 53.0% were married couples living together, 9.4% had a female householder with no husband present, and 34.4% were non-families. 29.1% of all households were made up of individuals, and 14.0% had someone living alone who was 65 years of age or older. The average household size was 2.38 and the average family size was 2.93.

In the city, the population was spread out, with 24.2% under the age of 18, 11.0% from 18 to 24, 26.7% from 25 to 44, 20.7% from 45 to 64, and 17.4% who were 65 years of age or older. The median age was 37 years. For every 100 females, there were 90.8 males. For every 100 females age 18 and over, there were 86.8 males.

The median income for a household in the city was $36,700, and the median income for a family was $45,259. Males had a median income of $31,865 versus $21,035 for females. The per capita income for the city was $18,006. About 5.1% of families and 8.8% of the population were below the poverty line, including 10.1% of those under age 18 and 7.2% of those age 65 or over.

Economy
As of 2016, Fremont's single largest employer was Hormel Foods, with an estimated 1000–1500 workers, whose hog-processing plant has been described as "the nation’s largest producer of Spam."  The next-largest employers were Fremont Health Medical Center, Fremont Public Schools, and Nye Health Services, each with an estimated 500–1000 employees.

Costco began building a poultry complex in 2019 that includes a processing facility, hatchery and feed mill. The facility is known as the Lincoln Premium Poultry.

Arts and culture
The Louis E. May Historical Museum is housed in a Victorian house built by Fremont's first mayor, Theron Nye, in 1874. A log cabin on the site is an example of the type of dwelling in which the earliest pioneers lived who moved to Nebraska as part of the Homestead Act. Historic downtown Fremont is known for its numerous antique stores, and a collection of historical buildings.

Several local buildings are on the National Register of Historic Places (NRHP). Among these is the Love-Larson Opera House on Broad Street, built in 1888. Later used as apartments and a grocery store, it was restored for theatre use by a non-profit group in the 1970s, and again in 2003 by the Fremont High Drama Club.

John C. Fremont Days, which is a celebration of Fremont's history through a parade, Chautauqua, rodeo, classic car show and vendors with handmade crafts.

Two regional Boy Scout camps, Camp Cedars and Camp Eagle, are located near Fremont, along the Platte River.

Fremont forms part of the Nebraska Statewide Arboretum collection.

Parks and recreation
Located in the northwest corner of Fremont near the "Washington Heights" neighborhood is the Fremont Golf Club (FGC). The FGC was completed in 1930 and features  of golf from the longest tees for a par of 71.

In 2007 construction of the "Splash Station" water park was completed. The park cost an estimated $5.1 million and features an interactive train slide, combination lap pool and wave pool, body slide and speed slide.

Education
Fremont is the home of the undergraduate liberal arts college, Midland University, which houses the Musbach Art Center, among other attractions. The Metropolitan Community College system has a community college campus in Fremont as well.

There is one public high school, Fremont Senior High (part of the Fremont Public School System), one private school, Archbishop Bergan Catholic School (Pre-K-12), and one private elementary/middle school, Trinity Lutheran School.

Transportation
 U.S. Route 30
 U.S. Route 77
 U.S. Route 275

Notable people
 William L. Armstrong, served as a United States Representative and Senator from Colorado
 Mildred Banfield, Alaska state legislator 
 Robert Beerbohm, American comic book historian
 Sue Bierman, San Francisco civic activist and Supervisor
 Gutzon Borglum, sculptor
 Harold Eugene Edgerton, pioneer in stroboscopic photography
 Marg Helgenberger, film and television actress
 Charlie Janssen, Nebraska State Auditor, former member of Nebraska legislature
 Doron Jensen, founder of Timber Lodge Steakhouse
 Richard A. Jensen, theologian and professor at Lutheran School of Theology at Chicago
 Jason Licht, general manager of NFL's Tampa Bay Buccaneers
 James Milliken, Chancellor of the University of Texas System
 Ben Sasse, United States Senator
 Julie Sommars, film and television actress
 Sloppy Thurston, starting pitcher in Major League Baseball
 Mary A. Hitchcock Wakelin, educator and temperance reformer
 Zach Wiegert, player in the National Football League

References

External links
 City of Fremont

 
Cities in Nebraska
Micropolitan areas of Nebraska
Cities in Dodge County, Nebraska
County seats in Nebraska
Populated places established in 1871
1871 establishments in Nebraska